The Leica M-E (Typ 220) is a digital rangefinder camera manufactured by Leica Camera. It was released on 17 September 2012. The M-E is Leica's first entry-level rangefinder model, with a technical specification that is nearly identical to the Leica M9, and based around the same 18MP full frame CCD sensor. It does not offer the M9's built-in USB port, but keeps pace with an identical 2 frames per second continuous shooting mode, hot shoe and Leica's classic rangefinder design. The M-E does not have a frame-lines lever, it preselects the correct frame-line for any lens when it is attached. The M-E, like the M9 and the M Monochrom was made of brass around a magnesium chassis. The M-E is only available with an anthracite grey paint finish.

The Leica M-E (Typ 220) was succeeded by the Leica M (Typ 262) in 2015.

M-E
Digital rangefinder cameras
Cameras introduced in 2012

References

External links